Palaia is a comune (municipality) in the Province of Pisa in the Italian region Tuscany, located about  southwest of Florence and about  southeast of Pisa.

Palaia borders the following municipalities: Capannoli, Montaione, Montopoli in Val d'Arno, Peccioli, Pontedera, San Miniato.

See also
Bonamico, Italian wine grape that is also known as Uva di Palaia and may have originated in Palaia

References

External links

 Official website

Cities and towns in Tuscany